"Wunna" (stylized in all caps) is a song by American rapper Gunna, released on May 18, 2020 as the second single from his second studio album of the same name (2020). Produced by Turbo, the song interpolates "Surf" by Young Thug featuring Gunna and samples "Speed It Up" by Gunna.

Charts

Certifications

References

2020 singles
2020 songs
Gunna (rapper) songs
Songs written by Gunna (rapper)
300 Entertainment singles